The Beijing Convention (formally, the Convention on the Suppression of Unlawful Acts Relating to International Civil Aviation) is a 2010 treaty by which state parties agree to criminalise certain terrorist actions against civil aviation.

Creation and entry into force
The Convention was concluded on 10 September 2010 at the Diplomatic Conference on Aviation Security in Beijing. (At the same conference, the Protocol Supplementary to the Convention for the Suppression of Unlawful Seizure of Aircraft was adopted.) Parties that ratify the Convention agree to criminalise using civil aircraft as a weapon and using dangerous materials to attack aircraft or other targets on the ground. The illegal transport of biological, chemical, and nuclear weapons is also criminalised under the Convention.

The negotiation of a new aviation security treaty that would address emerging threats to aviation was in part prompted by the September 11 attacks. At the conclusion of the conference, the U.S. delegate stated that "[o]n the eve of the anniversary of the 9/11 terrorist attacks, the United States can think of no more fitting and hopeful way to mark that occasion than with the adoption of these two new major counterterrorism instruments."

The treaty entered into force on 1 July 2018 following Turkey's accession thereto. It has been signed by 34 states and ratified or acceded to by 45 (as of January 2023).

Notes

See also
 Tokyo Convention
 Hague Hijacking Convention
 Hostages Convention
 SUA Act

External links
Text.
Text from another source on unodc.org
Signatures and ratifications.

2010 in China
2010 in aviation

International Civil Aviation Organization treaties
Terrorism treaties
Treaties concluded in 2010
Treaties entered into force in 2018
Treaties of Angola
Treaties of Bahrain
Treaties of Benin
Treaties of Ivory Coast
Treaties of the Czech Republic
Treaties of Cuba
Treaties of the Dominican Republic
Treaties of France
Treaties of Ghana
Treaties of Guyana
Treaties of Kuwait
Treaties of Mali
Treaties of Malta
Treaties of Mozambique
Treaties of Myanmar
Treaties of the Netherlands
Treaties of Panama
Treaties of Paraguay
Treaties of Romania
Treaties of Saint Lucia
Treaties of Sierra Leone
Treaties of Sweden
Treaties of Switzerland
Treaties of Turkey
Treaties of Uganda
Treaties extended to the Caribbean Netherlands